Maakri Kvartal is a skyscraper in Estonia. It is located in the Maakri district of Estonia's capital, Tallinn.

Gallery

References

Commercial buildings in Estonia
Skyscrapers in Estonia
Skyscraper office buildings